Pudsey is a constituency represented in the House of Commons of the UK Parliament since 2010 by Stuart Andrew, a Conservative.

Since 1997 campaigns in the seat have resulted in a minimum of 33.1% of votes at each election consistently for the same two parties' choice for candidate, and the next-placed party's having fluctuated between 3.1% and 20.8% of the vote — such third-placed figures achieved much higher percentages in 1992 and in previous decades.

The result in 2017 was the 23rd-closest nationally (of 650 seats).

Boundaries

Historic boundaries
The Redistribution of Seats Act 1885 provided that the constituency should consist of:
 the municipal borough of Leeds save for those parts in the Leeds constituencies
 the Parishes of Drighlington, Hunsworth, and Tong,
 so much of the Parishes of Calverley with Farsley and Pudsey as are not included in the Municipal Borough of Bradford,
 the Parishes of Churwell, Gildersome, Horsforth and Rawdon in the Sessional Division of Skyrack.

Post-1950 boundaries
1950–1983: The Municipal Borough of Pudsey, and the Urban Districts of Aireborough and Horsforth.

1983–2010: The City of Leeds wards of Aireborough, Horsforth, Pudsey North, and Pudsey South.

2010–present: The City of Leeds wards of Calverley and Farsley, Guiseley and Rawdon, Horsforth, and Pudsey.

History
1885–1950
The Pudsey constituency was first created in 1885 by the Redistribution of Seats Act 1885, and it was first used in the general election that year. The seat had formerly been part of Eastern West Riding of Yorkshire constituency. 
On 1 June 1908 George Whiteley voluntarily resigned from Parliament resulting in a by-election in the constituency.

The constituency was abolished in 1918 and replaced by the constituency of Pudsey and Otley until 1950.

1950-date
The constituency was recreated for contesting in the 1950 general election and has existed ever since.

Nomenclature
In their Third Periodic Review of Westminster Constituencies (1976–1983) the Boundary Commission initially suggested renaming the constituency Leeds West, with the existing Leeds West constituency in turn being renamed Leeds West Central. This was opposed at local enquiries where the current name was retained.

Constituency profile
Since 1979 the constituency has been a bellwether.  The constituency covers suburban settlements to the upland west and north-west of Leeds, including Pudsey, Farsley, Horsforth, Yeadon and Guiseley with low dependency on social housing, average workers' income close to the British average and low unemployment. This was from its 1950 recreation a win for candidates who were members of the Conservative Party before a member of the Labour Party gained it in the New Labour landslide of 1997.

Members of Parliament

Elections

Elections in the 2010s

The 2017 election saw the Green Party standing aside after talks with the Labour candidate, to seek to avert Andrew's re-election, but ultimately Andrew was narrowly reelected.

The 2015 election saw a record-equal total of five candidates stand in Pudsey.

Elections in the 2000s

Elections in the 1990s

Elections in the 1980s

Elections in the 1970s

Elections in the 1960s

Elections in the 1950s

Elections in the 1910s

Elections in the 1900s

Elections in the 1890s

Elections in the 1880s

See also
 List of parliamentary constituencies in West Yorkshire

Notes

References

Parliamentary constituencies in Yorkshire and the Humber
Politics of Leeds
Pudsey
Constituencies of the Parliament of the United Kingdom established in 1885
Constituencies of the Parliament of the United Kingdom disestablished in 1918
Constituencies of the Parliament of the United Kingdom established in 1950